Parud District is a district (bakhsh) in Sarbaz County, Sistan and Baluchestan Province, Iran. At the 2006 census, its population was 28,501, in 5,413 families.  The district is entirely rural. The district has two rural districts (dehestan): Murtan Rural District and Parud Rural District.

References 

Sarbaz County
Districts of Sistan and Baluchestan Province